Igreja da Penha Longa is a church in Linhó, Sintra, Portugal. It is classified as a National Monument.

Churches in Lisbon District
National monuments in Lisbon District